The 1999 All-Africa Games football tournament was the 7th edition of the African Games men's football tournament. The football tournament was held in Johannesburg, South Africa between 9–19 September 1999 as part of the 1999 All-Africa Games.

Qualified teams

The following countries have qualified for the final tournament:

Squads

Final tournament
All times given as local time (UTC+2)

Group stage

Group 1

Group 2

Knockout stage

Seventh place match

Fifth place match

Semifinals

Third place match

Final

Final ranking

External links
All-African Games 1999 - rsssf.com

1999
Football
1999 in African football
International association football competitions hosted by South Africa
1999–2000 in South African soccer